Almási is a surname. Notable people with the surname include:

Csaba Almási (born 1966), Hungarian long jumper
István Almási (1944–2017), Hungarian teacher and politician
Ladislav Almási (born 1999), Slovak footballer
Lenke Almási (born 1965), Hungarian gymnast
Péter Almási (born 1975), Hungarian sprint canoer
Tamás Almási (born 1948), Hungarian documentary film director
Zoltán Almási (born 1976), Hungarian chess player

Hungarian-language surnames